Água Fria River may refer to:

 Água Fria River (Braço Menor), Brazil
 Água Fria River (Tocantins River), Brazil